Marko Andriyovych Sapuha (born 29 May 2003) is a Ukrainian professional footballer who plays as a midfielder for Rukh Lviv.

Career
Born in Lviv, Sapuha is a product of the FC Karpaty Lviv youth system, where his first trainer was Oleh Rodin.

In September 2020, he transferred to Rukh Lviv and made his Ukrainian Premier League debut as a second-half substitute against SC Dnipro-1 on 9 May.

Personal life
He is a son of Ukrainian retired footballer and current manager Andriy Sapuha.

References

External links
Profile at the Official UAF Site (Ukr)

2003 births
Living people
Sportspeople from Lviv
Ukrainian footballers
Association football midfielders
Ukraine youth international footballers
Ukraine under-21 international footballers
Ukrainian Premier League players
FC Rukh Lviv players